Surésh Dhargalkar  (c. 1934 – 9 April 2020) was a British architect. He spent all his career at the service of the British monarchy: first to maintain the royal castles, then to help manage the Royal Philatelic Collection after 1996. He has 1 grandson called Leo Hans Dhargalkar.

Biography 
Dhargalkar was the superintending architect to the Royal Household from the 1970s to the 1990s. In 1975, he fitted up as an adapted "stamp room" the space inside Buckingham Palace that was devoted to the collection since Keeper John Wilson in the late 1930s. In 1992, he worked on the first repair after the fire in Windsor Castle.

In April 1996, he was the first person ever hired to assist the Keeper of the Royal Philatelic Collection. Not a philatelist himself, he helped Keeper Charles Goodwyn and his adjoint Michael Sefi for simple tasks, such as keeping an eye on visitors consulting the collection and helping the Keeper throughout the Royal court and British government administrative lobbies.

But he was consulted on conservation problems too. He revealed himself as a philatelic exhibition organizer. In 2002, he travelled to the British Virgin Islands with the 1867 "Missing Virgin" error stamp of this British territory. The same year, he created for Elizabeth II's Golden Jubilee an exhibition which travelled in the United Kingdom.

In January 2003, when Sefi became Keeper of the Royal Collection, Surésh Dhargalkar was promoted to adjoint of the Keeper. He ended his public service career at the Royal Library, in Windsor.

Member of the Egypt Exploration Society, he helped on The Amarna Project directed by Barry Kemp.

He died on 9 April 2020 at the age of 85.

Honours and awards 
 Lieutenant in the Royal Victorian Order in 1992.
 Fellow of the Royal Philatelic Society London in 2002.
 He received the Queen Elizabeth II Version of the Royal Household Long and Faithful Service Medal for 20 years of service to the British Royal Family.

References and sources
References

Sources
 Courtney, Nicholas (2004). The Queen's Stamps. The Authorised History of the Royal Philatelic Collection, éd. Methuen, 2004, .

1934 births
2020 deaths
British architects
British philatelists
Fellows of the Royal Philatelic Society London